Ti Parat Aaliye is an Indian Marathi language horror drama series which aired on Zee Marathi. It is directed by Ankush Marode. The series premiered from 16 August 2021 by replacing Devmanus. Vijay Kadam has made a comeback with this series.

Plot summary 
The story is about nine friends who go to a resort for celebration as their exams just got over. While playing besides the pool they push one of the friends, who has water phobia, into the pool. As she is unable to swim, she dies inside the pool. 10 years later, they arrange a reunion and go back to the same resort where they encounter all sorts of paranormal activities.

Cast 
 Vijay Kadam as Baburao Tandel
 Kunjika Kalvint as Sayali
 Shreyas Raje as Satej
 Vaishnavi Karmarkar as Anuja
 Tejas Mahajan as Mandy
 Tanvi Kulkarni as Rohini
 Anup Belwalkar as Abhay
 Sameer Khandekar as Hanumanta
 Nachiket Devasthali as Vikrant
 Anushka Junnarkar as Nilambari
 Prathamesh Shivalkar as Tikaram Rajaram Chavan
 Varsha Padwal as Tikya's mother
 Sarang Doshi as Rohini's husband
 Devendra Sardar as Inspector Lokhande
 Sayali Gite as Mandy's sister

References

External links 

Ti Parat Aaliye at ZEE5

Marathi-language television shows
Zee Marathi original programming
2021 Indian television series debuts
2021 Indian television series endings